Amrendra Pratap Singh is an Indian politician and a member of the Bihar Legislative Assembly serving as a minister in the Government of Bihar. He is the grandson of Harihar Singh, the former Chief Minister of Bihar.

Early and Personal Life 

Singh was born in Chaugain village of the Shahabad district (now in Buxar) to Harihar Singh also known as Bihari Ji Singh. His grand father was a freedom fighter and the Chief Minister of Bihar and his elder brother Mrigendra Pratap Singh was the Finance minister and speaker of the Jharkhand Legislative Assembly.

Political career 

Singh joined Jana Sangh in the state of Bihar as an associate of Raghubar Das, former Chief Minister of Jharkhand. Inspired by Jayaprakash Narayan, he also took part in the JP Movement. After split of the Jana Sangh faction from Janata Party, he too joined the newly formed Bharatiya Janata Party.
He was granted candidacy by the BJP to contest six consecutive elections of which he got elected on four occasions.
Between 2000–2015, he was the representative of the Arrah constituency. He was also made the deputy speaker of the assembly from 2012–2015. In the 2015 Bihar Legislative Assembly election, he lost his seat to Mohammad Nawaz Alam of the RJD.
He won his seat back in the 2020 Bihar Legislative Assembly election on a BJP ticket supported by NDA defeating his nearest rival of MGB with an impressive margin. He was appointed a Cabinet Minister in the Seventh Nitish Kumar ministry for the first time.

See also 

 Arrah (194)
 2015 Bihar Legislative Assembly election
 2020 Bihar Legislative Assembly election

References

Living people
People from Bhojpur district, India
Deputy Speakers of the Bihar Legislative Assembly
People from Arrah
Bihar MLAs 2000–2005
Bihar MLAs 2005–2010
Bihar MLAs 2010–2015
Bharatiya Janata Party politicians from Bihar
Bihar MLAs 2020–2025
State cabinet ministers of Bihar
1947 births